Arnold Kent (1899–1928) was an Italian-born American actor. He was born in Sesto Fiorentino as  Lido Manetti and acted under that name in Italy, appearing in films such as Goodbye Youth (1918) and Quo Vadis (1924). He moved then to Hollywood where he played supporting roles in films such as Hula (1927) with Clara Bow and Clive Brook. He died in Los Angeles the following year after a car accident shortly before he was due to make a film with Mary Pickford.

Selected filmography
 The Clemenceau Affair (1917)
 Goodbye Youth (1918)
Red Love (1921)
 Through the Shadows (1923)
 Quo Vadis (1924)
 The Hearth Turned Off (1925)
 The Love Thief (1926)
 Maciste against the Sheik (1926)
 Evening Clothes (1927)
 The World at Her Feet (1927)
 Hula (1927)
 The Woman on Trial (1927)
 Beau Sabreur (1928)
 The Showdown (1928)
 The Woman Disputed (1928)

References

Bibliography
 Goble, Alan. The Complete Index to Literary Sources in Film. Walter de Gruyter, 1999. 
Phillips, Alastair & Vincendeau,  Ginette. Journeys of Desire: European Actors in Hollywood. BFI, 2006.

External links

1899 births
1928 deaths
Actors from Florence
American male silent film actors
Italian male silent film actors
Italian emigrants to the United States
Road incident deaths in California
20th-century Italian male actors
20th-century American male actors